The Keystone Assault is a member of the United States Women Football League. Previously have been a member of the Women's Football Alliance and a former charter member of the league. The team began play in the WFA for its inaugural 2009 season.  Based in the Pennsylvania capital of Harrisburg, the Assault plays its home games at Lower Dauphin Middle School and formerly at East Pennsboro High School in nearby Hummelstown, Pennsylvania. The team was derived from many players and coaches from the defunct Central PA Vipers (2006-2009).

Season-By-Season

|-
|2009 || 4 || 4 || 0 || 4th National Northeast (WFA) || --
|-
|2010 || 6 || 2 || 0 || 2nd National East (WFA) || --
|-
|2011 || 3 || 5 || 0 || 2nd National Northeast (WFA) || --
|-
|2012 || 6 || 1 || 0 || 1st National Division (WFA) || --
|-
|2013 || 7 || 2 || 0 ||  Mid Atlantic Division (IWFL)  || --
|-
|2014 || 8 || 1 || 0 || 2nd Mid Atlantic Division (IWFL)  || --
|-
|2015 || 9 || 0 || 0 || Northeast Division (WSFL)  || WSFL Champions
|-
|2019 || 4 || 4 || 0 || USWFL ||
|-
!Totals || 38 || 19 || 0

* = current standing

Roster

2009

Season schedule

2010

Season schedule

** = Won by forfeit

2011

Standings

Season schedule

2012

Standings

Season schedule

External links
Keystone Assault official website

Independent Women's Football League
Women's Football Alliance teams
Cumberland County, Pennsylvania
Sports in Harrisburg, Pennsylvania
American football teams established in 2009
2009 establishments in Pennsylvania
Women's sports in Pennsylvania